is an active volcano in Honshu, Japan. A large eruption in 887 AD sent pyroclastic flows all the way to the Japan Sea.

Morphology
The volcano takes the form of a lava dome that was built above a ridge of a Tertiary mountain range near the Japanese coast. The volcano is one of the youngest in Japan, its age is estimated at only 3100 years old. The top of the lava dome is cut by fissures where mild phreatic eruptions have taken place in recent historical times.

Historical eruptions
Three major magmatic eruptions have taken place in historical time, in 887 AD, 1361 and 1773, these eruptions are VEI 3-–4 in range and have produced lava and pyroclastic flows that have reached the coast. The eruption of 1361 is responsible for the current summit lava dome. Since 1773 all eruptions have been phreatic and have come from fissures and craters at the summit and sides of the dome.

1974 eruption
The first eruption in 25 years took place on 28 July 1974. This eruption was a phreatic eruption. The eruption came from fissures 200 m on the side of the summit lava dome, producing widespread ashfall. Ash fell on cities around the area. Three students on the volcano were killed by either poisonous gases or ejecta.

1987 eruption
A smaller eruption took place in 1987. Two ash plumes were detected rising from the NE flank and the SE flank, later investigation showed steam venting from eight different spots.
During the eruption many townspeople had to flee the area.

1989 eruption
On 30 March 1989, a steam column issued from Niigata-Yake-Yama, four days later a steam column containing a small amount of ash was erupted.

1997 and 1998 eruptions
Two other eruptions were recorded from Niigata-Yake-Yama on 26 October 1997 (which continued until 10 December) and 30 March 1998. These were both small eruptions (VEI 1) which originated from the east flank of the summit dome.

References

External links 

 Niigata-Yakeyama - Japan Meteorological Agency 
  - Japan Meteorological Agency
 Niigata Yakeyama - Geological Survey of Japan
 

Volcanoes of Niigata Prefecture
Active volcanoes
Volcanoes of Honshū